Sir Wilfred Deakin Brookes,  (17 April 1906 – 1 August 1997) was an Australian businessman, manufacturer and Royal Australian Air Force officer. He was appointed a Commander of the Order of the British Empire in 1972 and was knighted in 1979 in recognition of his service to commerce and industry.

Early life
Brookes was born in Melbourne, Victoria, to Ivy (née Deakin) and Herbert Brookes. His father was a prominent businessman, political activist and philanthropist. His maternal grandfather was the politician Alfred Deakin, who was Prime Minister of Australia at the time of Wilfred's birth.

References

1906 births
1997 deaths
Australian Commanders of the Order of the British Empire
Australian Companions of the Distinguished Service Order
Australian Knights Bachelor
Businesspeople from Melbourne
People educated at Trinity College (University of Melbourne)
Military personnel from Melbourne
Royal Australian Air Force officers
Royal Australian Air Force personnel of World War II